Fendlerbush may refer to:

 Fendlera
 Fendlerella, Utah fendlerbush